Pierre-Louis Stapleton (17 July 1758 in Brussels – 24 February 1823 in Brussels) was a Franco-Belgian ballet dancer and choreographer. He was also known from around 1759 by the pseudonym Eugène Hus, after his stepfather Jean-Baptiste Hus.

Life
He was the son of Louis Stapleton, an Irish officer in the garrison at Brussels, and Elisabeth Bayard, a ballet dancer at the Théâtre de la Monnaie known by the pseudonym Mlle Bibi. Deserted by his father when he went off on campaign, Pierre-Louis soon got on the stage alongside his mother – aged around 4 he danced before prince Charles-Alexandre de Lorraine, who offered him 50 ducats in a gold box in recognition of his precocious talents, according to Hus's obituary in the Journal de Brussels. In 1762, Jean-Baptiste Hus arrived in Brussels as ballet master returning to the Théâtre de la Monnaie. Pierre-Louis was adopted by Hus (Elisabeth was Hus's mistress and later wife) and followed the couple on their wanderings, performing at Lyon (1764–67 and 1770–79), where Pierre-Louis began his career as a ballet master under Hus's guidance.

With Pierre Gardel and Auguste Vestris, Eugène Hus was one of the main founders of 19th century ballet and a witness to major political and artistic changes. He was the only living link between Noverre and Russian ballet, via the Petipa family.

Works 
 1784 : Le Ballon (Lyon, 9 February)
 1789 : L'Oracle accompli (Bordeaux, 24 August)
 1790 : Lausus et Lydie (Nantes)
 1793 : Les Muses, ou le Triomphe d'Apollon (Paris, 12 December)
 1796 : Lise et Colin ou La Surveillance inutile, (Paris, 4 August)
 1797 : Psyché (Rouen, July)
 1798 : Tout cède à l'amour (Bordeaux, August)
 1799 : Kiki, ou l'Île imaginaire (Paris, 9 November)
 1800 : Augustine et Benjamin, ou le Sargines de village (Paris, 4 November)
 1801 : Les Chevaliers du soleil, ou Amour et dangers (Paris, 21 June)
 1801 : L'Héroïne de Boston, ou les Français au Canada (Paris, 12 October)
 1802 : Riquet à la houpe (Paris, 13 December)
 1803 : La Fille mal gardée, ou Il n'est qu'un pas du mal au bien, after Dauberval (Paris, 13 February)
 1803 : Jeanne d'Arc, ou la Pucelle d'Orléans (Paris, 15 April)
 1804 : Les Hamadryades, ou l'Amour vengé (Bordeaux, 22 March)
 1804 : Les Vendangeurs du Médoc, ou les Deux baillis dupés (Paris, 20 July)
 1804 : Le Gascon gascon malgré lui (Paris, 17 November)
 1805 : L'Ingénu, ou le Sauvage du Canada (Paris, 17 January)
 1805 : Amanda (Paris, 31 July)
 1805 : L'Enchanteur Azolin, ou le Visir imaginaire (Paris, 12 December)
 1806 : La Dansomanie ou la Fête de M. Petit-Pas (Bordeaux, August)
 1807 : Les Illustres fugitifs, ou les Trois journées (Paris, 8 January)
 1810 : Le Retour du seigneur, ou la Dot (Carcassonne, 23 February)
 1813 : La Pucelle d'Orléans (Paris, 10 November)
 1815 : Je l'aurais gagé ! (Brussels, 30 March)
 1817 : La Naissance du fils de Mars et de Flore, ou les Vœux accomplis (Brussels, 27 March)
 1818 : La Fête des dames, ou la Journée du 19 janvier (Brussels, 19 January)
 1818 : Le Nid d'amours, ou les Amours vengés (Brussels, 9 March)

References 

 Eugène Hus at César 

Entertainers from Brussels
1758 births
1823 deaths
Ballet choreographers
French male ballet dancers
Belgian male ballet dancers
French people of Irish descent
18th-century ballet dancers
Entertainers of the Austrian Netherlands